South Carolina Highway 641 (SC 641) is a  primary state highway in the U.S. state of South Carolina. It provides the city of Allendale with a direct route toward Charleston, via SC 64 and U.S. Route 17 (US 17). It also serves access to Rivers Bridge State Park.

Route description

History

The highway was established around 1932 as a new primary spur of SC 64 to SC 36 (today US 601). By 1938, SC 641 was extended west on new routing to SC 33/SC 331 (today US 321) in Sycamore. In 1942, its alignment was straightened, leaving Rivers Bridge Road (S-5-31/S-15-37). By 1948, SC 641 was extended west to Allendale, replacing part of SC 73. Between 1968-1970, SC 641 was truncated at US 301, its former route replaced by SC 125.

Junction list

See also

References

External links

 
 Mapmikey's South Carolina Highways Page: SC 641

641
Transportation in Allendale County, South Carolina
Transportation in Bamberg County, South Carolina
Transportation in Colleton County, South Carolina
1932 establishments in South Carolina